Torbjörn Kartes (born 23 April 1979) is a German politician. Born in Freiburg im Breisgau, Baden-Württemberg, he represents the CDU. Torbjörn Kartes served as a member of the Bundestag from the state of Rhineland-Palatinate from 2017 to 2021.

Life 
He became member of the bundestag after the 2017 German federal election. He is a member of the Committee for Labour and Social Affairs and the Committee for Family, Senior Citizens, Women and Youth.

References

External links 

  
 Bundestag biography 

1979 births
Living people
Members of the Bundestag for Rhineland-Palatinate
Members of the Bundestag 2017–2021
Members of the Bundestag for the Christian Democratic Union of Germany